The Arizona State Senate is part of the Arizona Legislature, the state legislature of the US state of Arizona. The Senate consists of 30 members each representing an average of 219,859 constituents (2009 figures). Members serve two-year terms with term limits that limit Senators to a maximum four consecutive terms (eight years) before requiring a one-term respite prior to running again. Members of the Republican Party are currently the majority in the Senate. There are currently 16 women serving in the Senate after Raquel Terán was appointed, making it the first time a majority of the body was composed of female members.

As with the Arizona House of Representatives, members to the Senate are elected from the same legislative districts as House members, however one Senator represents the constituency, while for the House there are two Representatives per district. This districting system is similar to those of the Idaho and Washington State Senate. In political science, this type of legislative district is called a multi-member district.

Like other upper houses of state and territorial legislatures and the federal U.S. Senate, the Senate can confirm or reject gubernatorial appointments to the state cabinet, commissions and boards.

The Senate convenes in the adjacent legislative chambers at the Arizona State Capitol in Phoenix.

Leadership of the Senate
Arizona, along with Oregon, Maine, New Hampshire and Wyoming, is one of the five U.S. states to have abolished the Office of the Lieutenant Governor, the nominal senate president in many states.  As a result, the Senate elects its own presiding officer, the President of the Senate, who presides over the body, appoints members to all of the Senate's committees and to joint committees, and may create other committees and subcommittees if desired. The Senate President also appoints a President pro tempore, who serves for the duration of a session of the legislature, to preside in their absence, and may appoint a temporary President pro tempore in the absence of the President and President pro tempore.

The current President of the Senate is Republican Warren Petersen of District 14, the Senate Majority Leader is Sonny Borrelli of District 30. The current Minority Leader is Mitzi Epstein of District 12 with Juan Mendez of District 8 as the Assistant Minority Leader.

Leadership information

Current composition

Current members, 2023–2025

† Member was originally appointed.

Committees
The current standing committees of the Arizona Senate  are as follows:

Past composition of the Senate

See also

 Arizona State Capitol
 Arizona Legislature
 Arizona House of Representatives
 List of representatives and senators of Arizona Legislature by districts (2023–2033)
 List of state and territorial capitols in the United States

References

External links

 Official Arizona State Senate website
 

Senate
 
State upper houses in the United States